Instituto Thomas Jefferson (ITJ) is a private school in Tlalnepantla de Baz, State of Mexico, in the Mexico City metropolitan area. It serves preschool through senior high school.

References

External links
 Instituto Thomas Jefferson 

High schools in the State of Mexico